Cymindis marginella is a species of ground beetle in the subfamily Harpalinae. It was described by Brulle in 1839.

References

marginella
Beetles described in 1839